George Aubourne Clarke  (1879 – 13 February 1949) was a Scottish meteorologist, best known for his photographs of cloud types.

From 1903 to 1943, he was the metereological observer at the Cromwell Tower Observatory at the University of Aberdeen. While there he made photographs of clouds, which were published in a book that became the standard reference for metereologists and the military.

He was awarded the first Hood medal from the Royal Photographic Society in 1933 for his work as a photographer.

He retired in 1947 and died two years later, aged 69.

Publications
Clouds; a Descriptive Illustrated Guide-book to the Observation and Classification of Clouds, with a preface by Sir Napier Shaw, Constable & Company, Ltd. (1920)

References

Scottish photographers
Scottish meteorologists
Academics of the University of Aberdeen
Fellows of the Royal Photographic Society
1879 births
1949 deaths